Mieczyslaw Dziadulewicz (born 29 January 1960) is an English former footballer who played as a midfielder.

Club career
Dziadulewicz began his career at Southend United, signing professional forms in 1978, after joining the club at youth level. Following his release from Southend at the end of the 1977–78 season, Dziadulewicz signed for Southern League club Chelmsford City. In February 1979, following a successful trial, Dziadulewicz signed for hometown club Wimbledon. Dziadulewicz made two Football League appearances for Wimbledon, before moving to Finland, signing for KuPS. In 1979, following two goals in eight league games for KuPS, Dzidulewicz re-signed for Wimbledon, scoring once in 26 league appearances during his time there. In 1981, Dziadulewicz signed for FC Haka. Dziadulewicz routinely switched between Haka and Chelmsford City, playing for Haka in the summer and Chelmsford in the winter, during the domestic winter break in Finland. Dziadulewicz subsequently played for Finnish clubs OTP, OLS, FC Ilves, FC Tigers and FC Oulu. During the 1992–93 season, Dziadulewicz played for Canvey Island.

Managerial career
In 2007, Dziadulewicz took up a player-manager role at Tervarit. In 2008, following a coaching role at AC Oulu, Dziadulewicz was appointed manager of JIPPO. After leaving JIPPO in 2010, Dziadulewicz took up a coaching role at JoPS. Ahead of the 2015 Kakkonen season, Dziadulewicz returned to JIPPO as manager. In November 2017, SC Riverball announced the appointment of Dziadulewicz ahead of the 2018 season.

References

1960 births
Living people
Association football midfielders
English footballers
English football managers
English expatriate footballers
Expatriate footballers in Finland
English expatriate sportspeople in Finland
Footballers from Wimbledon, London
Southend United F.C. players
Chelmsford City F.C. players
Wimbledon F.C. players
Kuopion Palloseura players
FC Haka players
FC Ilves players
Canvey Island F.C. players
English Football League players
Southern Football League players
Mestaruussarja players
Veikkausliiga players
English people of Polish descent
Association football coaches
Oulun Työväen Palloilijat players